Fowlerichthys is a genus of frogfishes. The first one was described in 1801.

Species
There are currently five recognized species in this genus:
 Fowlerichthys avalonis D. S. Jordan & Starks, 1907 (Roughbar frogfish)
 Fowlerichthys ocellatus Bloch & J. G. Schneider, 1801 (Ocellated frogfish)
 Fowlerichthys radiosus Garman, 1896 (Singlespot frogfish)
 Fowlerichthys scriptissimus D. S. Jordan, 1902
 Fowlerichthys senegalensis Cadenat, 1959 (Senegalese frogfish)

References

Antennariidae
Marine fish genera
Taxa named by Thomas Barbour